Ayr Parkhouse Football Club were a football club from the town of Ayr in Scotland. The club was a member of the Scottish Football League until 1910, when they merged with neighbours Ayr to form Ayr United.

History 

Ayr Parkhouse were formed in 1886 and took their name from the Parkhouse farmhouse where the club's players trained, William Frew, a centre-forward for Parkhouse, was actually the son of the farmer who owned it. They initially played their home games at Ballantine Drive, before moving to the Ayr Racecourse ground, now known as the Old Racecourse. In 1888 Ayr vacated the better developed Beresford Park, and Ayr Parkhouse moved in, where they played for the remainder of their existence, although altering the ground since moving in, . In 1891 they joined the Ayrshire Football League, but moved onto the Ayrshire Football Combination in 1893, of which they were founder members along with Ayr with whom they would develop a healthy rivalry.

However, Ayr Parkhouse took the decision to remain a faithfully amateur club, only turning professional in 1905. Despite the club's amateur status, they competed well in their league and the Scottish Cup, reaching the quarter finals of the competition in the 1894–95 season, where they fell to that year's runners-up Renton.

Local success continued, but the rivalry that was built up with Ayr ceased to have a regular outlet when that club were admitted to membership of the Scottish Football League in 1897. Ayr Parkhouse's ambitions were beginning to outgrow their local successes and the club's early amateurness fuelled hostility to membership of the professional Scottish Football League was waning. In 1901 they unsuccessfully applied for membership, but, after finishing second in the Scottish Amateur Football League they managed to get elected to full league status in 1903, just ahead of St. Johnstone. Their initial season in the league was a disaster. They finished bottom of Division Two and therefore had to reapply for membership, but they declined to do so. Aberdeen were elected instead.

After two seasons out of the league, playing instead in the Scottish Football Combination, Ayr Parkhouse were accepted back into the Second Division. This was in 1906. The club performed without much distinction in the following four seasons. At the end of the 1909–10 season, Ayr and Ayr Parkhouse merged to form Ayr United.

Colours 

1886–? Royal blue shirts, royal blue shorts.
?–1910 Royal blue & white hooped shirts, royal blue shorts.

Honours

 Ayrshire Cup
 Winners (1): 1901–02

 Ayrshire Consolation Cup
 Winners (1): 1897–98

 Ayr Charity Cup
 Winners (7): 1893–94, 1894–95, 1895–96, 1896–97, 1897–98, 1898–99, 1905–06

 Kilmarnock Charity Cup
 Winners (2): 1894–95, 1896–97

 Scottish 2nd XI Cup
 Runners-up (1): 1901–02

Notable former players
Alex Bell: transferred to Manchester United in 1902. He was Manchester United's first Scotland international, in 1912.
John Cameron
Robert Capperauld

References

 
 

Ayr United F.C.
Defunct football clubs in Scotland
Association football clubs established in 1886
Association football clubs disestablished in 1910
Sport in Ayr
Scottish Football League teams
1886 establishments in Scotland
1910 disestablishments in Scotland
Football in South Ayrshire